Atenizus taunayi is a species of beetle in the family Cerambycidae. It was described by Melzer in 1920.

References

Oemini
Beetles described in 1920